Sardasht ( is a city in Rudasht District of Lordegan County, Chaharmahal and Bakhtiari province, Iran. The latest census in 2016 showed a population of 5,691 people in 1,184 households.

References 

Lordegan County

Cities in Chaharmahal and Bakhtiari Province

Populated places in Chaharmahal and Bakhtiari Province

Populated places in Lordegan County

fa:سردشت (لردگان)